Pink Narcissus is a 1971 American arthouse drama film directed by James Bidgood and starring (unknowns) Bobby Kendall, Don Brooks and stage actor Charles Ludlam. It visualizes the erotic fantasies of a gay male prostitute.

Premise 
Between visits from his keeper, or John, a handsome male prostitute (Bobby Kendall), alone in his apartment, lounges, fantasizing about worlds where he is the central character. For example, he pictures himself as a matador, a Roman slave boy and the emperor who condemns him, and the keeper of a male harem for whom another male performs a belly dance.

Production 
The film is mostly shot on 8 mm film with bright, otherworldly lighting and intense colors. Aside from its last, climactic scene, which was shot in a downtown Manhattan loft, it was produced in its entirety (including outdoor scenes) in Bidgood's small New York City apartment over a seven-year (from 1963 to 1970) period and ultimately released without the consent of the director, who therefore had himself credited as Anonymous. He said in an interview, "See, why I took my name off of it was that I was protesting, which I'd heard at the time that's what you did..."

Provenance 
Because the name of the filmmaker was not widely known, there were rumors that Andy Warhol was behind it. In the mid-1990s, writer Bruce Benderson began a search for its maker based on several leads and finally verified that it was James Bidgood, who was still living in Manhattan and was working on a film script. In 1999, a book researched and written by Benderson was published by Taschen about Bidgood's body of photographic and filmic work.

Bidgood's unmistakably kitschy style has later been imitated and refined by artists such as Pierre et Gilles.

In 2003, the film was re-released by Strand Releasing as the film had its 35th anniversary in 2006.

Music 
 Joseph Haydn: Horn Concerto No. 1
 Modest Mussorgsky: Pictures at an Exhibition
 Modest Mussorgsky: Night on Bald Mountain
 Sergei Prokofiev: Alexander Nevsky
 Kenneth Gaburo: "Lemon Drops"
 Genaro Nunez, Banda Taurina, Rosalio Juarez: "Corazon Hispano"

See also 
 List of American films of 1971

References

External links 
 
 

1971 films
1970s erotic drama films
American erotic drama films
American avant-garde and experimental films
American LGBT-related films
1971 LGBT-related films
LGBT-related drama films
1970s avant-garde and experimental films
1971 drama films
Films shot in New York City
Films about male prostitution in the United States
1970s English-language films
1970s American films